Les Besser (born 1936) is an American electronics engineer, an expert in microwave technology. He is the founder (1973) of Compact Software, the first commercially successful microwave computer-aided design (CAD) company, which  commercialize his program COMPACT (Computerized Optimization of Microwave Passive and Active CircuiTs).

Les Besser was born and raised in Hungary (interbellum and World War II Hungary and Hungarian People's Republic). In 1956 he escaped to the West and became a Canadian citizen in 1971. Later he moved to the United States, graduated from the University of Colorado, and in 2000 he naturalized in the United States.

Besser began working on simulators during his employment at Hewlett-Packard (1966–1969), using the BASIC computer language and time-sharing computers. After leaving HP, he joined the newly formed microwave division of Fairchild Semiconductor, where he authored his first-generation program, SPEEDY, Besser later converted another program, originally written for his graduate thesis work, to run on a commercial time-share system and launched a part-time business, Compact Engineering (later renamed Compact Software). Besser submitted the description of COMPACT to 
IEEE Transactions on Circuit Theory in 1972, but it was initially rejected and accepted after addition of large amount of mathematics into it. Besser was associated with development of COMPACT until 1983. In 1985 Besser founded Besser Associates, a company that offers education in microwave technology. He also co-authored a number of textbooks on the subject. In 2004 he retired and sold the company, but continued to occasionally teach courses.

In 2013, The Hewlett Packard Memory Project published Les Besser's two-volume memoirs, Hurdling to Freedom: A Hungarian's Escape to America, downloadable from the Project's website.

Awards and recognition
IEEE Life Fellow
1983: IEEE MTT "Microwave Applications Award"
1987: IEEE RFTG "Career Award" 
2000:  IEEE "Third Centennial Medal"
2006: IEEE Educational Activities Board's "Meritorious Achievement Award in Continuing Education"
2007: IEEE MTT "Distinguished Educator" award

References

1936 births
Living people
American electronics engineers
American businesspeople
Electronic design automation people
Canadian emigrants to the United States 
Hungarian emigrants to the United States 
University of Colorado alumni